Sir Philip Parker (1601 – 22 June 1675) was an English politician who sat in the House of Commons from 1640 to 1648.

Parker was the son of Sir Calthorpe Parker of Groton, Suffolk and his wife Mercy Soame, daughter of Sir Stephen Soame, Lord Mayor of London. He was admitted at Queens' College, Cambridge on 18 April 1618 and admitted at the Inner Temple in 1621. He was knighted on 19 November 1624. He came into possession of the family estate at Erwarton and was High Sheriff of Suffolk in 1637.

In April 1640, Parker was elected Member of Parliament for Suffolk in the Short Parliament. He was re-elected in November 1640 for the Long Parliament and sat until 1648 when he was excluded under Pride's Purge.
 
Parker married Dorothy Gawdy, daughter of Sir Robert Gawdy of Claxton, Norfolk. Their son Philip later became a baronet.

References

Year of birth unknown
1675 deaths
People from Babergh District
Alumni of Queens' College, Cambridge
High Sheriffs of Suffolk
English MPs 1640 (April)
English MPs 1640–1648